The 2018 Argentina Women's Hockey National Tournament was the 10th edition of the women's national tournament. It was held from 10 to 13 May 2018 in Buenos Aires, Argentina.

Buenos Aires won the tournament for the fifth time after defeating Tucumán 2–0 in the final.

Squads
Players followed with a country flag are those involved in its senior national team.

Amateur Field Hockey Association of Buenos Aires

Head Coach: Fernando Ferrara

 1 - Belén Succi 
 2 - Emilia Forcherio
 3 - Francesca Giovanelli
 4 - Pilar Campoy 
 5 - Agostina Alonso 
 6 - Macarena Rojas
 7 - Agustina Albertario 
 8 - Geraldine Fresco Pisani ©
 9 - Carla Dupuy
 10 - Ana López Basavilbaso
 11 - Magdalena Fernández Ladra 
 12 - Mercedes Díaz Moraiz
 13 - Mercedes Socino 
 14 - Agustina Habif 
 15 - María José Granatto 
 16 - Estefanía Cascallares
 17 - Delfina Merino 
 18 - Luciana Galimberti
 19 - Antonela Rinaldi
 20 - Ivanna Pessina 

Bahía Blanca's Hockey Association

Head Coach: Martín Berlato

 1 - Marina Urruti
 2 - Bianca Donati 
 3 - Agostina Dottori
 4 - Bárbara Dichiara 
 5 - Florencia Scheverin ©
 6 - Micaela Gentili
 7 - Eugenia Urruti
 8 - Valentina Zamborain
 9 - Luciana Argüello Acuña
 10 - Valentina Costa Biondi
 11 - Julieta Kluin
 12 - Lucía López Izarra
 13 - Melany Cardenas
 14 - Itatí Ruilopez
 15 - Gabriela Ludueña
 16 - Carola Dichiara
 17 - Lucila Martínez Arana
 18 - Josefina Calio
 19 - Florencia Vallejos

Córdoba's Hockey Federation

Head Coach: Santiago Fuentes

 1 - Paula Pasquetin
 2 - Laura González
 3 - Camila Broglia
 4 - Paula Bortoletto
 5 - Carmela Briski
 6 - Martina Quetglas
 7 - Paulina Forte ©
 8 - Juliana Ríos Ferreyra
 9 - Julieta Jankunas 
 10 - Emilia Inaudi
 11 - Valentina Braconi 
 12 - Agustina D'Ascola
 13 - Agustina Somerfeld
 14 - Justina Paz
 16 - Emilia Alonso González
 17 - Candelaria Paroli
 18 - Victoria Miranda
 19 - Paz Villegas
 20 - Sofía Funes

Mendoza's Hockey Association

Head Coach: Fernanda Carrascosa

 1 - Florencia Saravia
 2 - Lucía Tapia
 4 - Sofía Avendaño
 5 - Gabriela Koltes ©
 6 - Micaela Conna
 7 - Agustina Cabrejas
 8 - Florencia Barbera
 9 - Eugenia Mastronardi 
 10 - Bárbara Muzaber
 11 - Delfina Thome Gustavino
 12 - Mariana Scandura
 13 - Priscila Jardel 
 14 - Valentina Esley
 15 - Julieta Medici
 16 - Sofía Vercelli
 17 - Chiara Medici
 18 - Luciana Molina
 19 - Sofía Montaña

Salta's Hockey Association

Head Coach: Ana Medina

 1 - Clara Salazar Camilo
 3 - Constanza Abudi Flores
 4 - Carla Giampaoli
 5 - Rosario Villagra
 6 - Mariana Gea Salim
 7 - Macarena Pescador
 8 - Mercedes Saavedra ©
 9 - Victoria Carrizo
 10 - Constanza Gómez
 11 - Virginia Stieglitz
 12 - Ana Cortez Navarro
 14 - Andrea del Frari Crespo
 15 - Gimena Cortez Navarro
 16 - Celeste Gómez
 18 - Giuliana Torcivia
 19 - Camila Gómez
 20 - Jorgelina Maciel Peralta
 22 - Ailín Martínez

San Juan's Hockey Association

Head Coach: Maximilano Díaz

 1 - Julieta Cheruse
 2 - Julieta Luna
 3 - Tatiana Risueño Guarino
 4 - Sol Pujador
 5 - Florencia Morales
 6 - Carina Guzmán
 7 - Clarisa Narvaez Guirado
 8 - Evelyn Barquiel
 9 - Viviana Perisotto
 10 - Luciana Agudo
 11 - Pilar Graffigna
 12 - Victoria Gómez Trigo
 13 - Pilar Narvaez Guirado ©
 14 - Martina Nozica
 15 - Guadalupe Ruíz Yacante
 16 - Josefina Otto
 17 - Rosario Dubos
 18 - Verónica Perisotto
 19 - Cecilia López Murua
 20 - Micaela Carrizo

Santa Fe's Hockey Federation

Head Coach: Maximilano Díaz

 1 - Cecilia Pastor
 2 - Carla Miraglio
 3 - Celina Basilio
 4 - Ximena Mendoza
 5 - Celina Traverso © 
 6 - Stefanía Antoniazzi
 7 - Corina Diez
 8 - Natalia Ravasio
 9 - Yoana Aguilera
 10 - Florencia Villar
 11 - Luciana Pimpinella
 12 - Magdalena Chemes
 13 - Carolina Arregui
 14 - Gracia Villar
 15 - Candela Carosso
 16 - Milagros Escudero
 17 - Josefina Salamano
 18 - Sol Villar
 19 - Georgina Bernia
 20 - Pilar de Biase 

Tucumán's Hockey Association

Head Coach: Alberto Darnay

 1 - Paulina Carrizo
 2 - Carolina Lobo
 3 - Ana Gray
 4 - Guadalupe Novillo
 5 - Victoria Sauze 
 6 - Tania Cruz
 7 - Solana Olmedo
 8 - Sofía Curia
 9 - Guadalupe Gallardo
 10 - Sofía Darnay
 11 - Karen Gordillo
 12 - Ivanna Gómez Rodríguez
 13 - Noel Rojas
 14 - Agustina Barreiro
 15 - Carla Moyano
 16 - Camila Machín © 
 17 - Florencia Klimbowsky
 18 - Valentina Garretón
 19 - Lucía Allier
 20 - Emidia Núñez López

Results

Pool A

Pool B

Second round

Quarterfinals

Seventh place game

Fifth place game

Medal round

Quarterfinals

Third place game

Final

Awards

Final standings
 Buenos Aires
 Tucumán
 Bahía Blanca
 Santa Fe
 Mendoza
 Córdoba
 Salta 
 San Juan

References

2018
2018 in women's field hockey
May 2018 sports events in South America
Hockey